Hastings-on-Hudson station is a commuter rail stop on the Metro-North Railroad's Hudson Line, located in Hastings-on-Hudson, New York.

As of August 2006, daily commuter ridership was 1154 and there are 783 parking spots.

History
Hastings-on-Hudson has had railroad service from as far back as the 1840s, pre-dating the Hudson River Railroad, and served both passengers and a local sugar refinery. In 1875, a major fire destroyed the waterfront, and the company running the sugar refinery left town, but other industries ended up taking its place.

The current Hastings-on-Hudson station building was built in 1910 by the New York Central Railroad. As with many NYCRR stations in Westchester County, the station became a Penn Central station upon the merger between NYC and Pennsylvania Railroad in 1968, until it was taken over by Conrail in 1976, and then by Metro-North Railroad in 1983.

Station layout
The station has two slightly offset high-level side platforms each eight cars long. The inner tracks not next to either platform are used by express trains, only one of the express tracks is powered.

References

External links

Hastings-on-Hudson Metro-North Station (TheSubwayNut)
 Entrance from Google Maps Street View

Metro-North Railroad stations in New York (state)
Former New York Central Railroad stations
Railway stations in Westchester County, New York
Railway stations in the United States opened in 1849
1849 establishments in New York (state)